An Occasional Hell is a crime novel by the American writer Randall Silvis.

Set in 1990s in the lower Monongahela River Valley below Pittsburgh, it tells the story of Ernest DeWalt, a former Chicago private investigator and successful novelist who is now a college professor. DeWalt's new life is interrupted when a philandering colleague, Alex Catanzaro, is killed in a farmland trysting place and his widow asks the former PI for help. It was made into a film starring Tom Berenger in 1996.

References

1993 American novels
American crime novels
Novels set in Pennsylvania
Permanent Press (publisher) books